Hakahana is a suburb of Windhoek, the capital of Namibia. The township is situated in the north of the town between the suburbs of Katutura, Wanaheda, and Okuryangava.

Hakahana was also a former constituency in Khomas Region, Namibia. In 2003, the constituency was split into Eastern Hakahana and Western Hakahana, both soon renamed into Tobias Hainyeko constituency and Moses ǁGaroëb constituency, respectively. Hakahana means "Hurry up" in Otjiherero.

References

Suburbs of Windhoek
Shanty towns in Namibia
Otjiherero words and phrases
Constituencies of Khomas Region